Espergærde is a town situated in North Zealand near Øresund in Denmark and is statistically considered part of the larger urban area Espergærde-Snekkersten-Elsinore, some 5 to 8 km south of the centre of Elsinore and in reality separated from the urban area of Elsinore-Snekkersten by a 100 m wide unbuilt area, Egebæksvang forest and area under natural protection around Flynderupgård (previously a village, later a farm, today a museum). The urban area of Espergærde also covers the two former villages Tibberup and Mørdrup and part of the former fishing village of Skotterup, with 11.524 inhabitants (2008). Espergærde is well limited to the north by Egebæksvang forest and Flynderupgård, to the west by Rolighedsmoserne (swamp area) and Helsingørmotorvejen (motorway or highway), to the south by Krogerup mansion fields and Babyloneskoven (Babylone forest). Espergærde is part of Region Hovedstaden (the capital area).

Espergærde has its own postal number, 3060, and is split in two parishes: Egebæksvang Parish (church nearby the old fishermans village) and Mørdrup Parish (church next to the urban centre).

History 
 
The name is first documented in 1555 as Esperegierde. The first part of the name refers to an older village, Asperød, meaning "clearing in an aspen forest"=. - g(k)ærde means "fenced".

The original village consisted only of two or three farms located at the top of the coastal cliff. In about 1500, a fishing village with 6-8 houses developed on the beach. A road along the coast connected it to Skotterup and Snekkersten) to the north and Humlebæk, Sletten) to the south. From Espergærde a road travelled inland to the village of Mørdrup situated about 2 km from the coast.

According to the land tax registration 1682, 4 fishermen had reserved parts of the coastal area for fishing eel in Øresound, for which they had to pay 2 Danish rigsdaler in land taxes per year; 2 areas were "øde" (out of use). 6 houses without land had to pay 1 rigsdaler in land taxes.

Espergærde, together with the villages Mørdrup and Tibberup, belonged to the mansion Krogerup situated to the south. The farmers in these villages had to make hoveri (farm work) for the mansion, and the road from Mørdrup to the south towards Tibberup (and from here further on to Krogerup) still has the name "Hovvej", referring to these conditions. Krogerup mansion was one of few private estates in North Zealand which mainly belonged to the crown. Along the coast line, and in front of the slope south of Espergærde harbour, fisherman houses were built with easy access to the sea. Only a few houses are left, with Strandvejen 376 as one of the best preservedA typical fishermans house from the early 1800.

Summer holiday area and railway town 
During the years from 1841 to 1847 on 28 May there was a celebration recalling the starting of Provinsialstænderne (Provincial represents council) similar to celebrations in other cities. The reason for this was that the radical representative, ship clarating N.P. Kinck won the election in Helsingør on 8 January 1841 for the Provincial Represents Council for the Danish Islands over the conservative candidate. Egebæksvang was elected as the place to celebrate this victory partly because of request from rural residents. The first celebration brought together 5–6000 people from the area and Elsinore by Hvidestensbakken (White Stone Hill) in the forest, and also celebrations during the next years took place here. During Treårskrigen (Three Year War) 1848–1850 in the Dutchies Slesvig-Holstein no celebrations took place and from 1852 the celebrations started up again but now in honour of the June 5-constitution; in honour of the constitution a stone monument was raised in the forest. The celebrations took place every year until 1855 and then came to a stop during some years. Instead the forest was used for parties for different purposes like building a harbour for the fishermen in Snekkersten and Espergærde, but also for other events. All these celebrations became well known and drew summer holiday guests to the area, including people from Copenhagen.

A steam boat line was expanded to the north and from 1877 the steam boat made stops in Copenhagen and the villages along the coast: Skovshoved and Bellevue Beach, Tårbæk, Skodsborg, Vedbæk, Rungsted, Humlebæk, Snekkersten, Helsingør and Helsingborg. The same year a post line opened from Elsinore to Snekkersten, Skotterup and Egebæksro (on the fringe of the forest Egebæksvang just south of the small Egebækken stream running into The Øresound). The post coastline stopped after a short time but the summer holiday visitors continued to grow.

Until the 1870s the visitors came mainly on day trips to the forest and the beach, but according to the law of business enterprise (næringsloven) of 1857 it was specifically allowed that house owners could rent their homes to foreign visitors and supply them with food, so the local people started to rent out their homes during the summer and themselves lived in a building for stocking materials, horse staples or other secondary purposes. Shortly after, summer cottages started to be built on areas next to the coast, the oldest being "Mary Hill" from 1848, the next "Hostruphus", built as a national gift in 1870 for the poet Christian Hostrup. During the 1870s and 1880s, the coastal area between Egebæksvang and Øresound became one of the most popular places for Copenhagen summer holiday visitors, and in 1880 a large part of the coast was already filled with summer cottages.

The increasing number of summer visitors gave way to new enterprise. First, a large number of cottages were built, thus creating jobs for building workers. In 1850 there were only 3 building workers in Espergærde area, one in each of the villages Skotterup, Mørdrup and Tibberup. In 1870 there were 8 building workers. In 1880 already 18. In (?) the number of building workers had increased to 22.

Also, the summer visitors gave new possibilities for trade, both for the farmers and fishermen, who were allowed to sell their own products, and for shop keepers like the store in Skotterup and the stores in Elsinore.

At the end of the 19th century, the number of summer cottages grew quickly and from 1897, when Kystbanen (coastal rail road) was opened (with a station from 1903), about 1 km from Espergærde, a small town grew up, mainly of summer cottages.

Now followed all kinds of shopkeepers and a bath hotel built in 1896 with the name hotel "Gefion" above the coastal slope and a great view to the fishermens village and the sea. More and more houses and summer cottages were built between the village and the railroad station on the southern side of Egebæksvang forest. Together with these houses came new craftsmen and traders, even some industrial production. However, most of the people went by train as commuters to Elsinore or Copenhagen, and at a time the Coastal Railroad was known as the "gross traders train" (grosserertoget).

The development continued until World War II, and the fishermen's village became a true town, first with many summer holiday visitors, later as a residential area for people working in Elsinore or Copenhagen. In 1911 there were 500 people in the town, in 1916 713 people in 144 houses.

Espergaerde features in the song "Denmark, 1943" by American folksinger Fred Small about the rescue of the Danish Jews:

And it's fire up the diesel and look out for swells / We're leaving Espergaerde behind us / 
Who strike at our friends strike us as well / We'll pray the patrol boats don't find us / 
When the sirens are wailing and shouts fill the night / Never will you stand alone / 
So it's over the Øresund / Till the day we can welcome you home.

After WW2 

In 1950 the inhabitants had grown to some 2600 people. In 1947 the first building plan was made in the local community with the proposal to build on the entire 2 km2 area from the coast to the inland villages, and during the 1960s this development took place. From 1960 to 1970 the number of inhabitants grew from 4,000 to 10,000 people. Because of this development Espergærde became the administrative centre of the local community. In 1970 the rural community was merged with Elsinore city, and Espergærde became a centre for the planning department.

In 2009 Espergærde was officially considered to be connected to Elsinore, even if the two urban areas are still divided by a 100m (approx.) undeveloped area between Espergærde-Skotterup and Snekkersten-Helsingør.

Road net and bus connections 
From Espergærde there are two main roads heading inland and to the northwest. In the north Mørdrupvej (vej = road), passes the villages of Gurre and Nygård and ends in Ålsgårde.  To the south Hornbækvej passes the villages of Kvistgård and Tikøb and leads on to Hornbæk. The town has bus connections via these two roads to the towns of Ålsgårde and Hornbæk, and a third bus connection via Strandvejen to Elsinore.

Railroad connections 
Espergærde has railroad connections to Copenhagen and Elsinore via Kystbanen (Coast line), and to Hillerød city and Elsinore via Nordbanen (Northern line) from the railroad station in Mørdrup.

Trade and service 

The urban centre is Espergærde centret (centre), Denmark's oldest planned centre, with shops, institutions, medical care, dentist, public library and lutheran church. At Øresund coast Espergærde has a harbour, Espergærde Havn, for yachts. It was planned to but never built into a marina.

Espergærde is also the place for one of Denmark's biggest high schools, Espergærde Gymnasium & HF, which since the middle of the 1970s replaced Helsingør Latinskole (Elsinore Latin school). On the high school there is every year an international conference, attracting several hundred pupils to the town.

Recreational areas 

Both north and south of Espergærde are so-called green wedges. These forested or cultivated areas span out to the coast - or until the Strandvejen (Beach road).

To the north are situated Egebæksvang (forest) and Flynderupgård farm fields towards Snekkersten, to the south farm fields towards Krogerup and the town of Humlebæk. To the west the town is limited by the Rolighedsmoserne (a swamp area) and part of Kelleris Hegn (a forest) situated between Nordbanen (railroad) and Helsingørmotorvejen (Elsinore motorway).

Notable people
 Martin Andersen Nexø (1869–1954), writer, lived in Espergærde
 Aino Taube (1912 in Espergærde – 1990), Swedish film and theatre actress  
 Kim Bodnia (born 1955), a Danish actor, writer, and director, grew up in Espergærde 
 Kenneth Willardt (born 1966) a Danish photographer based in New York City, specializing in celebrity, beauty, and fashion portraiture;  grew up in Espergaerde
 Tim Christensen (born 1974), a Danish singer-songwriter and multi-instrumentalist, grew up in Espergærde

Notes

References
 Tageo.com, "VESTSJAELLAND DENMARK Geography Population" (coordinates), 2007, webpage: Tageo-index.
 Denmark Postal codes, webpage: Postnumre-DK.
 Tele.dk Denmark detailed road map, webpage: Tele-DK-Danmark.

External links
 Espergærde Centret
 Espergærde Gymnasium & HF
 Espergærde Idræts Forening
 Flynderupgård

Helsingør Municipality
Cities and towns in the Capital Region of Denmark